Veinticinco de Mayo Partido (25 May) is a partido in the centre-north of Buenos Aires Province in Argentina.

Settlements

Veinticinco de Mayo
Norberto de La Riestra
Pedernales
Del Valle
Gobernador Ugarte
Valdés
San Enrique
Agustín Mosconi
Ernestina
Lucas Monteverde
Antonio M. Islas
Huetel
Santiago Garbarini
Ortiz de Rosas
Martín Berraondo
Anderson
Araujo
Mamaguita
Pueblitos
Blas Durañona

 
Partidos of Buenos Aires Province
States and territories established in 1836